M. W. Talbot was a British rugby union player. He competed at the 1900 Summer Olympics and won silver as part of the Great Britain team in what was the first rugby union competition at an Olympic Games.

References

External links

 

Date of birth missing
Date of death missing
Olympic rugby union players of Great Britain
British rugby union players
Olympic silver medallists for Great Britain
Rugby union players at the 1900 Summer Olympics
Rugby union forwards